Pieris oleracea frigida, the Newfoundland white, is a subarctic subspecies of the mustard white butterfly. It is mostly confined to the Newfoundland area of Canada.

References 

oleracea frigida
Butterfly subspecies